The 2013 Africa Cup of Nations, also known as the Orange Africa Cup of Nations South Africa 2013 for sponsorship reasons, held from 19 January to 10 February 2013, was the 29th Africa Cup of Nations, the football championship of Africa organized by the Confederation of African Football (CAF). Starting from this edition, the tournament was switched to being held in odd-numbered years instead of even-numbered years so that it does not clash with the FIFA World Cup. This edition was therefore the first to be held in an odd numbered year since 1965.

South Africa hosted the tournament for the second time, after previously hosting the 1996 African Cup of Nations. The 2013 tournament is the highest attended edition of the Africa Cup of Nations under the current, 16-team format. The South African team was eliminated in the quarter-finals by Mali, following a penalty shoot-out. Zambia were the defending champions, but were eliminated in the group stage.

Nigeria won its third Africa Cup of Nations championship with a 1–0 victory over Burkina Faso in the final. Nigeria participated in the 2013 FIFA Confederations Cup in Brazil as the representative from CAF.

Host selection
Bids :
Angola
Gabon / Equatorial Guinea
Libya
Nigeria

Rejected Bids :
Benin / Central African Republic
Botswana
Mozambique
Namibia
Senegal
Zimbabwe

On 4 September 2006, the Confederation of African Football (CAF) approved a compromise between rival countries to host the Africa Cup of Nations after it ruled out Nigeria. CAF agreed to award the next three editions from 2010 to Angola, Equatorial Guinea, Gabon and Libya respectively. They assigned Angola in 2010, Equatorial Guinea and Gabon, which submitted a joint bid in 2012, and Libya for 2014.

This edition was awarded to Libya for the second time after 1982 African Cup of Nations.

Two-time former host Nigeria was the reserve host for the 2010, 2012 and 2014 tournaments, in the event that any of the host countries failed to meet the requirements established by CAF, although this ended up being unnecessary

The 2014 tournament was pushed forward to 2013 and subsequently held in odd-numbered years to avoid year-clash with the FIFA World Cup.

Libyan withdrawal
Due to the Libyan Civil War, Libya traded years with South Africa, so that South Africa hosted in 2013 and Libya will be hosting in 2017. This was ratified in September 2011 at CAF's Executive Committee in Cairo, Egypt.

Qualification

A total of 47 countries entered the qualification, including South Africa, which automatically qualified. Libya was not allowed to keep its automatic qualification after being stripped of its hosting rights due to the Libyan Civil War.
Many teams made their return to the finals in this tournament. The hosts, South Africa returned after a 4-year absence. Ethiopia appeared for the first time since 1982 (a 31-year absence). Other teams absent from the 2012 finals that featured in 2013 were Nigeria, Togo, DR Congo, and Algeria. Cape Verde made its finals debut. Teams that didn't qualify for this tournament from the 2012 African Cup of Nations were both co-hosts, Gabon and Equatorial Guinea, Libya, Senegal, Sudan, Guinea and Botswana. South Sudan was ineligible to participate as the qualifying competition had already started by the time its membership of CAF was confirmed.

Qualified nations

† Bold indicates champion for that year
† Italic indicates host

Venues

Host cities
The South African Football Association opened bidding to all 2010 FIFA World Cup host cities however a maximum of seven venues would be used. The final list of stadiums was initially to be announced by 30 March, but was pushed back to 4 April, 20 April, and then 3 May 2012.

The venues were announced on 4 May 2012. FNB Stadium hosted the opening match and the final. The other venues selected for matches were Mbombela Stadium, Nelson Mandela Bay Stadium, Royal Bafokeng Stadium and Moses Mabhida Stadium.

Host city during 1996 African Cup of Nations
Stadium/site used during 1996 African Cup of Nations
As "National Stadium"
Stadium expandable
All capacities are approximate

Training venues

Match ball
The official match ball for the 2013 Africa Cup of Nations was manufactured by Adidas and named the Katlego, which means "success" in Tswana language.  The name was chosen by African football fans via an online voting competition where it beat alternate names, Khanya (light) and Motswako (mixture).

Mascot
The official mascot of the tournament was Takuma, a hippopotamus wearing sports kit in South Africa's official yellow and green. The mascot was designed by Tumelo Nkoana, a 13-year-old South African student from Hammanskraal in Gauteng.

Draw
The draw for the final tournament took place on 24 October 2012 in Durban. Positions A1 and C1 were already assigned to the hosts (South Africa) and holders (Zambia) respectively. The other 14 qualified teams were ranked based on their performances during the last three Africa Cup of Nations, i.e. the 2008, 2010 and 2012 editions.

Moreover, a weighted coefficient on points was given to each of the last three editions of the Africa Cup of Nations as follows:
2012 edition: points to be multiplied by 3
2010 edition: points to be multiplied by 2
2008 edition: points to be multiplied by 1

The teams were then divided into four pots based on the ranking. Each group contained one team from each pot.

Match officials
The following referees were chosen for the 2013 Africa Cup of Nations.

Referees

 Mohamed Benouza
 Djamel Haimoudi
 Sidi Alioum
 Noumandiez Doué
 Gehad Grisha
 Eric Otogo-Castane
 Bakary Gassama
 Sylvester Kirwa
 Hamada Nampiandraza
 Koman Coulibaly
 Ali Lemghaifry
 Rajindraparsad Seechurn
 Bouchaïb El Ahrach
 Badara Diatta
 Bernard Camille
 Daniel Bennett
 Slim Jedidi
 Janny Sikazwe

Assistant referees

 Albdelhak Etchiali
 Jerson Emiliano Dos Santos
 Jean-Claude Birumushahu
 Evarist Menkouande
 Yanoussa Moussa
 Yéo Songuifolo
 Angesom Ogbamariam
 Theophile Vinga
 Malik Alidu Salifu
 Marwa Range
 Balla Diarra
 Redouane Achik
 Arsénio Chadreque Marengula
 Peter Edibe
 Félicien Kabanda
 Djibril Camara
 El Hadji Malick Samba
 Zakhele Siwela
 Ali Waleed Ahmed
 Béchir Hassani
 Anouar Hmila

Squads

Each team could register a squad of 23 players.

Group stage
The schedule of the final tournament was released on 8 September 2012.

Tie-breaking criteria
If two or more teams end the group stage with the same number of points, their ranking is determined by the following criteria:
 points earned in the matches between the teams concerned;
 goal difference in the matches between the teams concerned;
 number of goals scored in the matches between the teams concerned;
 goal difference in all group matches;
 number of goals scored in all group matches;
 fair play points system taking into account the number of yellow and red cards;
 drawing of lots by the organising committee.

All times South African Standard Time (UTC+2)

Group A

Group B

Group C

Group D

Knockout phase

In the knockout stages, if a match is level at the end of normal playing time, extra time shall be played (two periods of 15 minutes each) and followed, if necessary, by kicks from the penalty mark to determine the winner, except for the play-off for third place where no extra time shall be played.

Quarter-finals

Semi-finals

Third place play-off

Final

Awards
The following awards were given for the tournament:
Orange Player of the Tournament
 Jonathan Pitroipa

Pepsi Tournament Top Scorer
 Emmanuel Emenike

Samsung Fair Player of the Tournament
 Victor Moses

Nissan Goal of the tournament
 Youssef Msakni vs. Algeria

Team of the Tournament

Goalscorers
4 goals

 Emmanuel Emenike
 Mubarak Wakaso

3 goals

 Alain Traoré
 Seydou Keita

2 goals

 Jonathan Pitroipa
 Dieumerci Mbokani
 Kwadwo Asamoah
 Gervinho
 Yaya Touré
 Mahamadou Samassa
 Sunday Mba
 Victor Moses
 Siyabonga Sangweni

1 goal

 Sofiane Feghouli
 Hillal Soudani
 Aristide Bancé
 Djakaridja Koné
 Platini
 Héldon Ramos
 Fernando Varela
 Trésor Mputu
 Adane Girma
 Emmanuel Agyemang-Badu
 Christian Atsu Twasam
 John Boye
 Asamoah Gyan
 Wilfried Bony
 Didier Drogba
 Cheick Tioté
 Didier Ya Konan
 Cheick Fantamady Diarra
 Sigamary Diarra
 Issam El Adoua
 Youssef El-Arabi
 Abdelilah Hafidi
 Uwa Elderson Echiéjilé
 Brown Ideye
 Ahmed Musa
 May Mahlangu
 Lehlohonolo Majoro
 Tokelo Rantie
 Emmanuel Adebayor
 Jonathan Ayité
 Serge Gakpé
 Dové Wome
 Khaled Mouelhi
 Youssef Msakni
 Collins Mbesuma
 Kennedy Mweene

Own goals
 Nando (playing against Angola)

Team statistics

|-
|colspan="10"|Eliminated in the quarter-finals
|-

|-
|colspan="10"|Eliminated in the group stage
|-

Marketing

Sponsorship
Orange
Standard Bank
Pepsi
Samsung
Nissan
Ifd Kapital
Doritos
Adidas

Media
South African public broadcaster SABC was the host broadcaster of the tournament. It paid R65 million (US$7.5 million) for the rights, which entitle it to transmit all of the games across its radio and television platforms.

Broadcasting

 – Excluding France.
 – Excluding Bolivia, Brazil, Guyana, Paraguay and Suriname.

References

External links

Orange CAN 2013 at cafonline.com

 
2013
Africa Cup of Nations
Africa Cup of Nations
2013 Africa Cup of Nations
Africa Cup of Nations
Africa Cup of Nations
Africa Cup of Nations
Africa Cup of Nations